Monte Napoleone is a 1986 Italian film directed by Carlo Vanzina.

Cast
 Carol Alt as Margherita
 Luca Barbareschi as Guido
 Corinne Cléry as Chiara
 Renée Simonsen as Elena
 Renato Scarpa as Francesca's Husband
 Paolo Rossi as Luca
 Gianfranco Manfredi 
 Lorenzo Lena as Francesca's Daughter
 Sharon Gusberti as Raffaella
 Daniel Gélin as Padre di Elena
 Valentina Cortese as Madre di Guido
 Johan Bramberg as Tom
 Marisa Berenson as Francesca
 Fabrizio Bentivoglio as Roberto

The "long version" for television  
An alternative cut of the film was made for television which lasted about three hours and was broadcast in two episodes.

References

External links
 

1986 films
Italian comedy films
1980s Italian-language films
Films directed by Carlo Vanzina
Films set in Milan
1980s Italian films